The 1928 Kentucky Derby was the 54th running of the Kentucky Derby. The race was run on May 19, 1928.

Payout
The Kentucky Derby Payout Schedule

Field

Margins – 3 Lengths 
Time – 2:10 2/5
Track – Heavy

References

Kentucky Derby races
Kentucky Derby
Derby